The 1969 Federation Cup was the seventh edition of what is now known as the Fed Cup. 20 nations participated in the tournament, which was held at the Athens Tennis Club in Athens, Greece from 19 to 25 May. United States defeated Australia in the final, in what was the fourth final featuring both teams.

Participating teams

Draw
All ties were played at the Athens Tennis Club in Athens, Greece on clay courts.

First round
Indonesia vs. Greece

Bulgaria vs. Netherlands

Hungary vs. Canada

Second round
United States vs. Yugoslavia

Mexico vs. Italy

Czechoslovakia vs. Switzerland

Indonesia vs. Netherlands

West Germany vs. Canada

Belgium vs. Great Britain

France vs. South Africa

Quarterfinals
United States vs. Italy

Czechoslovakia vs. Netherlands

West Germany vs. Great Britain

France vs. Australia

Semifinals
United States vs. Netherlands

Great Britain vs. Australia

Final
Australia vs. United States

Consolation rounds

Qualifying Draw

Qualifying Semifinals
Belgium vs. Canada

South Africa vs. Indonesia

Qualifying Final
Belgium vs. South Africa

Final
South Africa vs. Mexico

References

Billie Jean King Cups by year
Federation Cup
Federation Cup
Federation Cup
Federation Cup
Federation Cup
Federation Cup